Defend Yourself is the eighth studio album by American indie rock band Sebadoh. It is the band's first album in fourteen years, since 1999's The Sebadoh.

The album was released on September 16, 2013 via Domino in the United Kingdom and on September 17, 2013 via Joyful Noise in the United States, respectively.

Track listing

Included with the limited edition tri-color vinyl and red color vinyl releases was a 7" single that had two tracks that were left off of the album. These tracks were also released on iTunes and included on the Japanese CD release along with the Secret EP track "All Kinds".

Personnel
Sebadoh
Lou Barlow - vocals, guitar, bass
Jason Loewenstein - vocals, bass, guitar
Bob D'Amico - drums, percussion

Other personnel
Lou Barlow - engineering
Jason Loewenstein - mixing
Wally Gagel - mixing
Pete Lyman - mastering

References

External links

2013 albums
Sebadoh albums
Joyful Noise Recordings albums
Domino Recording Company albums